Ruzaigh Gamildien (born 4 April 1989) is a South African professional soccer player who plays as a midfielder for South African Premier Division club Royal AM.

References

External links
 
 

1989 births
Living people
Soccer players from Cape Town
Cape Coloureds
South African soccer players
South Africa international soccer players
Association football midfielders
Milano United F.C. players
Bloemfontein Celtic F.C. players
AmaZulu F.C. players
Cape Town Spurs F.C. players
Santos F.C. (South Africa) players
Chippa United F.C. players
Cape Town All Stars players
Steenberg United F.C. players
Moroka Swallows F.C. players
Royal AM F.C. players
South African Premier Division players
National First Division players